Delias antara is a butterfly in the family Pieridae. It was described by Roepke in 1955. It is found in New Guinea.

The wingspan is about 56 mm. Adults are similar to Delias eichhorni.

Subspecies
D. a. antara (Central Mountains, Irian Jaya)
D. a. solana Morinaka & Nakazawa, 1997 (Pass Valley, Irian Jaya)

References

External links
Delias at Markku Savela's Lepidoptera and Some Other Life Forms

antara
Butterflies described in 1955